Georgia Dorotheou (born 20 October 1980) is a Greek handball player who competed in the 2004 Summer Olympics.

References

1980 births
Living people
Greek female handball players
Olympic handball players of Greece
Handball players at the 2004 Summer Olympics
Mediterranean Games competitors for Greece
Competitors at the 2005 Mediterranean Games
Sportspeople from Piraeus